Nezperce is a city in and the county seat of Lewis County, Idaho, United States. The population was 466 at the 2010 census, down from 523 in 2000. Nezperce is named for the local Nez Perce tribe of Native Americans. ("Nezperce" derives from a corruption of French words nez percé, literally "pierced nose.") There is one school district, Nezperce School District #302.

Geography

Nezperce is located on the Camas Prairie. Idaho State Highways 64, 62 and 162 have a junction in Nezperce.

Climate
According to the Köppen climate classification system, Nezperce has a humid continental climate (Köppen Dfb).

Demographics

Nezperce has a municipal airport, primarily used by cropdusters and light aircraft. The asphalt runway is 2,450 feet long, 30 feet wide, unlighted and has numerous obstructions. See airport/facility directory for more information.

2010 census
As of the census of 2010, there were 466 people, 191 households, and 130 families residing in the city. The racial makeup of the city was 95.1% White, 4.1% Native American, 0.2% Asian, and 0.6% from two or more races. Hispanic or Latino of any race were 0.6% of the population.

There were 191 households, of which 26.2% had children under the age of 18 living with them, 59.2% were married couples living together, 6.3% had a female householder with no husband present, 2.6% had a male householder with no wife present, and 31.9% were non-families. 28.3% of all households were made up of individuals, and 16.7% had someone living alone who was 65 years of age or older. The average household size was 2.36 and the average family size was 2.84.

The median age in the city was 48.2 years. 21.2% of residents were under the age of 18; 7.5% were between the ages of 18 and 24; 16.5% were from 25 to 44; 31.8% were from 45 to 64; and 23% were 65 years of age or older. The gender makeup of the city was 50.4% male and 49.6% female.

2000 census
As of the census of 2000, there were 523 people, 197 households, and 150 families residing in the city. The racial makeup of the city was 91.20% White, 1.34% African American, 1.91% Native American, 1.34% Asian, 0.76% from other races, and 3.44% from two or more races. Hispanic or Latino of any race were 0.76% of the population.

There were 197 households, out of which 33.5% had children under the age of 18 living with them, 67.5% were married couples living together, and 23.4% were non-families. 22.3% of all households were made up of individuals, and 12.7% had someone living alone who was 65 years of age or older.  The average household size was 2.61 and the average family size was 3.05.

In the city, the population was spread out, with 29.8% under the age of 18, 4.2% from 18 to 24, 20.8% from 25 to 44, 24.7% from 45 to 64, and 20.5% who were 65 years of age or older.  The median age was 42 years. For every 100 females, there were 107.5 males.  For every 100 females age 18 and over, there were 99.5 males.

The median income for a household in the city was $36,094, and the median income for a family was $40,000. Males had a median income of $30,625 versus $21,094 for females. The per capita income for the city was $15,450.  About 5.7% of families and 7.4% of the population were below the poverty line, including 11.1% of those under age 18 and 3.3% of those age 65 or over.

See also
 List of cities in Idaho

References

External links

 

Cities in Lewis County, Idaho
Cities in Idaho
County seats in Idaho